Black Hills  may refer to:

Places
 Black Hills in South Dakota and Wyoming
 Black Hills Airport in Spearfish, South Dakota
 Black Hills Gold Rush in South Dakota from 1874 to 1877
 Black Hills National Forest in South Dakota and Wyoming
 Black Hills Playhouse, a theater in South Dakota
 Black Hills State University in Spearfish, South Dakota
 In California:
 Black Hills (Contra Costa County)
 Black Hills (Imperial County)
 Black Hills (Kern County)
 Black Hills (Riverside County)
 Black Hills (San Bernardino County)
 In Arizona
 Black Hills (Greenlee County)
 Black Hills (Yavapai County)
 Black Hills (Oregon)
 Black Hills (Washington)
 Black Hills, Tasmania, a locality in Australia

Other
 Black Hills (1929 film), a silent American film directed by Norman Dawn
 Black Hills (1947 film), an American western film directed by Ray Taylor
 Black Hills Ammunition
 "Black Hills", a song by Scale the Summit from the album The Collective
 Black Hills, a 2010 novel by Dan Simmons
 "The Black Hills of Dakota" (song), a song from the musical Calamity Jane

See also 

 Black Hill (disambiguation)
 Black Mountains (disambiguation)
 Black Mountain (disambiguation)
 Black Rock (disambiguation)
 All articles beginning with Black Hills